Paul Robinson may refer to:

Arts and entertainment
Paul Robinson (cartoonist) (1898–1974), American comic strip artist (Etta Kett)
Paul Robinson (painter) (born 1959), English painter
Paul Michael Robinson (born 1963), American actor, photographer, producer
Paul Robinson (poet) (born 1977), British poet from Liverpool, England
Barry Boom, British reggae singer and producer, born Paul Robinson
Paul Robinson, singer with The Diodes
Paul Robinson (Neighbours), character in the Australian soap opera Neighbours

Sports

Association football (soccer)
Paul Robinson (footballer, born 1963), English footballer (left back) born in Hampstead, Greater London
Paul Robinson (footballer, born 1971), English footballer (forward) born in Nottingham
Paul Robinson (footballer, born November 1978), English footballer (striker) born in Sunderland
Paul Robinson (footballer, born December 1978), English footballer (left back) born in Watford, Hertfordshire
Paul Robinson (footballer, born 1979), English footballer (goalkeeper) born in Beverley, East Riding of Yorkshire
Paul Robinson (footballer, born 1982), English footballer (centre back) born in Barnet, Greater London
Paul Robinson (footballer, born 1984), English footballer (forward) born in Newcastle-upon-Tyne
Ashley-Paul Robinson (born 1989), English footballer

Other sports
Paul Robinson (American football) (born 1944)
Paul Robinson (cricketer) (1956–2013), South African cricketer
Paul Robinson (figure skater) (born 1965), British ice skater
 
Paul Robinson (tennis) (born 1973), British tennis player
Paul Robinson (climber) (born 1987), American rock climber and magazine editor
Paul Robinson (athlete) (born 1991), Irish middle-distance runner

Others
Paul H. Robinson Jr. (born 1930), United States Ambassador to Canada 1981–1985
C. Paul Robinson (1941–2023), American physicist and arms-control negotiator
Paul H. Robinson (born 1948), American law professor
 Paul Robinson, History professor at University of Ottawa Faculty of Social Sciences, the author of the book "Russian Conservatism"

See also
Robinson (name)